Pectis linearis, the West Indian cinchweed, is a summer blooming annual plant in the genus Pectis. Its floral region is generally Puerto Rico and the Virgin Islands.

References

linearis
Flora of Puerto Rico
Flora without expected TNC conservation status